Per Agne Erkelius (1935 – 24 February 2010) was a Swedish novelist, playwright and teacher. He made his literary debut in 1961, with the novel Städerna vid havet. Other novels are Fotografen from 1976 and Rembrandt til sin dotter from 1998. He was awarded the Dobloug Prize in 1995.

References

1935 births
2010 deaths
20th-century Swedish novelists
Dobloug Prize winners
Swedish male novelists
20th-century Swedish male writers